The 2011 Jeju United FC season is the clubs twenty-ninth season in the K-League. Jeju United competed in the K-League, League Cup, Korean FA Cup, and the AFC Champions League.

Current squad

Out on loan

Match results

K-League

League table

Results summary

Results by round

Korean FA Cup

League Cup

AFC Champions League

Group stage

Squad statistics

Appearances and goals
Statistics accurate as of match played 30 October 2011

Top scorers

Top assistors

Discipline

Transfer

In
 20 July 2011 –  Yang Joon-A – Suwon Samsung Bluewings
 July 2011 –  Nam Joon-Jae – Chunnam Dragons

Out
 20 July 2011 –  Park Hyun-Beom – Suwon Samsung Bluewings
 28 July 2011 –  Kang In-Jun – Daejeon Citizen
 28 July 2011 –  Lee Sang-Hyup – Daejeon Citizen (loan)
 July 2011 –  Cho Won-Kwang – Cheonan City FC
 July 2011 –  Yoo Wook-Jin – Free Agent
 July 2011 –  Hyun Kwang-Woo – Free Agent
 July 2011 –  Lee Yoon-Ho – Free Agent

References

 Jeju United FC website

Jeju United
2011